Wheaton Municipal Airport  is a city-owned public-use airport located three miles southwest of the central business district of Wheaton, a city in Traverse County, Minnesota, United States.

Facilities and aircraft 
Wheaton Municipal Airport covers an area of 110 acres and contains two runways: runway 16/34 has a 3,298 x 75 ft (1,006 x 23 m) asphalt surface and 6/24 is a 1,953 x 175 ft (595 x 53 m) turf surface. For the 12-month period ending September 23, 2010, the airport had 3,900 aircraft operations, an average of 75 per week: 100% general aviation. In January 2017, there were 11 aircraft based at this airport: 7 single-engine, 3 multi-engine and 1 helicopter.

References

External links 
 

Airports in Minnesota
Buildings and structures in Traverse County, Minnesota